Berenice Muñoz Gerardo (born 11 March 2000), is a Mexican football striker who currently plays for Querétaro of the Liga MX Femenil.

References

External links 
 

2000 births
Living people
Women's association football forwards
Mexican women's footballers
Liga MX Femenil players
People from Tulancingo
21st-century Mexican women